Let's Go Higher may refer to:
"Let's Go Higher" (Johnny Reid song), 2010
"Let's Go Higher" (Jordan Knight song), 2011